The Sankt Egidien station is the railway station of the Municipality of Sankt Egidien, Saxony, Germany.

Regional services

References

Railway stations in Saxony
Buildings and structures in Zwickau (district)
Railway stations in Germany opened in 1858